Vladičin Han is a town and municipality located in the Pčinja District of southern Serbia. As of 2011, the population of the town is 8,030, while the population of the municipality is 20,871.

History
From 1929 to 1941, Vladičin Han was part of the Vardar Banovina of the Kingdom of Yugoslavia.

Settlements

Aside from the town of Vladičin Han, the municipality includes the following settlements:

 Balinovce
 Bačvište
 Belanovce
 Beliševo
 Bogoševo
 Brestovo
 Dekutince
 Donje Jabukovo
 Dupljane
 Džep
 Garinje
 Gornje Jabukovo
 Gramađe
 Jagnjilo
 Jastrebac
 Jovac
 Kalimance
 Kacapun
 Koznica
 Kopitarce
 Kostomlatica
 Kržince
 Kukavica
 Kunovo
 Lebet
 Lepenica
 Letovište
 Ljutež
 Mazarać
 Manajle
 Manjak
 Mrtvica
 Ostrovica
 Polom
 Prekodolce
 Priboj
 Ravna Reka
 Rdovo
 Repince
 Repište
 Ružić
 Solačka Sena
 Srneći Dol
 Stubal
 Suva Morava
 Tegovište
 Urvič
 Vrbovo
 Zebince
 Žitorađe

Demographics

According to the 2011 census results, the municipality of Vladičin Han has a population of 20,871 inhabitants.

Ethnic groups
The ethnic composition of the municipality:

Economy
The following table gives a preview of total number of registered people employed in legal entities per their core activity (as of 2018):

Gallery

See also
 List of places in Serbia

References

External links

 

Populated places in Pčinja District
Municipalities and cities of Southern and Eastern Serbia